Garichtisee is a reservoir on Mettmenalp above Schwanden in the Canton of Glarus, Switzerland.

See also
List of mountain lakes of Switzerland

External links
Swissdams: Garichte

Lakes of the canton of Glarus
Reservoirs in Switzerland